Vats or Vatne is a village in Vindafjord municipality in Rogaland county, Norway. The village is located in the traditional district of Haugalandet between the southern end of the lake Vatsvatnet and the northern end of the Vatsfjorden. Vats Church is located in this village.

The village was the administrative center of the old municipality of Vats from 1891 until the municipality's dissolution in 1965.

The village area is an important industrial location.  The oil platforms Statfjord, Gullfaks and Troll were all built here. The Norwegian computer and software company Hatteland Group responsible for the AutoStore system is also headquartered in the village.

References

Villages in Rogaland
Vindafjord